Lesticus is a genus of beetles in the family Carabidae first described by Pierre François Marie Auguste Dejean in 1828.

Species 
Lesticus contains the following 133 species:

 Lesticus amabilis Chaudoir, 1868
 Lesticus ambulator Darlington, 1962
 Lesticus andamanensis (Chaudoir, 1878)
 Lesticus andrewesi (Straneo, 1938)
 Lesticus aruensis Dubault, Lassalle & Roux, 2013
 Lesticus assamicus Kuntzen, 1911
 Lesticus ater Roux & Shi, 2011
 Lesticus auricollis Tschitscherine, 1900
 Lesticus auripennis Zhu, Shi & Liang, 2018
 Lesticus baehrianus Lassalle & Roux, 2015
 Lesticus baweanicus Straneo, 1953
 Lesticus bennigseni Sloane, 1907
 Lesticus beroni Lassalle, 2012
 Lesticus bii Zhu, Shi & Liang, 2018
 Lesticus borneensis Straneo, 1949
 Lesticus brevilabris Emden, 1936
 Lesticus buqueti (Castelnau, 1834)
 Lesticus busuangae Heller, 1923
 Lesticus cavicollis Straneo, 1985
 Lesticus chalcothorax Chaudoir, 1868
 Lesticus chloronotus (Chaudoir, 1868)
 Lesticus coelestis Tschitscherine, 1897
 Lesticus crenicollis L.Schaufuss, 1887
 Lesticus cupreatus Heller, 1923
 Lesticus cupreoviolaceus Straneo, 1991
 Lesticus cupricollis Pouillaude, 1914
 Lesticus curtus Dubault, Lassalle & Roux, 2012
 Lesticus depressus Darlington, 1962
 Lesticus desgodinsi Tschitscherine, 1894
 Lesticus deuvei Dubault & Roux, 2006
 Lesticus dichrous Tschitscherine, 1897
 Lesticus drescheri Andrewes, 1937
 Lesticus ebeninus Dubault, Lassalle & Roux, 2011
 Lesticus episcopalis Dubault, Lassalle & Roux, 2008
 Lesticus feanus Bates, 1892
 Lesticus finisterrae Will & Kavanaugh, 2012
 Lesticus floresanus Straneo, 1980
 Lesticus freyi Straneo, 1956
 Lesticus fukiensis Jedlicka, 1956
 Lesticus fulgidicollis (Castelnau, 1834)
 Lesticus ganglbaueri Tschitscherine, 1898
 Lesticus gardineri Dubault, Lassalle & Roux, 2012
 Lesticus gracilis Darlington, 1962
 Lesticus gregori Kuntzen, 1911
 Lesticus habilis Dubault, Lassalle & Roux, 2011
 Lesticus harmandi Tschitscherine, 1900
 Lesticus hiekei Straneo, 1980
 Lesticus holzschuhi Straneo, 1985
 Lesticus ignotus Dubault, Lassalle & Roux, 2011
 Lesticus indus Tschitscherine, 1900
 Lesticus insignis Gestro, 1883
 Lesticus insulanus Dubault, Lassalle & Roux, 2008
 Lesticus isabellae Lassalle, 1985
 Lesticus jacobsoni Andrewes, 1929
 Lesticus janthinus Dejean, 1828
 Lesticus kaboureki Lassalle & Roux, 2015
 Lesticus kangeanensis Dubault, Lassalle & Roux, 2012
 Lesticus keieilensis Dubault, Lassalle & Roux, 2008
 Lesticus lakhonus Tschitscherine, 1900
 Lesticus lantschanus Straneo, 1987
 Lesticus latissimus Dubault, Lassalle & Roux, 2012
 Lesticus lautus Andrewes, 1930
 Lesticus lemoulti Kuntzen, 1914
 Lesticus leopoldi Andrewes, 1932
 Lesticus liparops Andrewes, 1932
 Lesticus lombokensis Kirschenhofer, 2007
 Lesticus louwerensi Straneo, 1948
 Lesticus luculentus Lassalle, 2012
 Lesticus magnus Motschulsky, 1860
 Lesticus medius Darlington, 1971
 Lesticus mendax Dubault, Lassalle & Roux, 2008
 Lesticus mouhoti (Chaudoir, 1868)
 Lesticus nepalensis Morvan, 1972
 Lesticus nicobarensis Dubault, Lassalle & Roux, 2013
 Lesticus nigerrimus Straneo, 1953
 Lesticus nigroviolaceus Dubault, Lassalle & Roux, 2008
 Lesticus nitescens Sloane, 1907
 Lesticus nubilus Tschitscherine, 1900
 Lesticus obtusus Lassalle, 2012
 Lesticus ornatus Dubault, Lassalle & Roux, 2012
 Lesticus overbecki Emden, 1936
 Lesticus peguensis Bates, 1892
 Lesticus perniger Roux & Shi, 2011
 Lesticus philippinicus Kuntzen, 1911
 Lesticus planicollis (Dejean, 1828)
 Lesticus politocollis Motschulsky, 1865
 Lesticus politus (Chaudoir, 1868)
 Lesticus praestans Chaudoir, 1868
 Lesticus prasinus Tschitscherine, 1900
 Lesticus pseudocupreatus Dubault, Lassalle & Roux, 2011
 Lesticus pseudoliparops Dubault, Lassalle & Roux, 2008
 Lesticus pulchellus Dubault, Lassalle & Roux, 2012
 Lesticus pulcher Lassalle, 2012
 Lesticus punctatostriatus Lassalle & Roux, 2015
 Lesticus purpurascens Straneo, 1959
 Lesticus putzeysi (Chaudoir, 1878)
 Lesticus rainerschnelli Dubault, Lassalle & Roux, 2012
 Lesticus rectangulus (Chaudoir, 1868)
 Lesticus restrictus Dubault, Lassalle & Roux, 2008
 Lesticus rotundatus Roux & Shi, 2011
 Lesticus salomonensis Dubault, Lassalle & Roux, 2011
 Lesticus salvazai Dubault, Lassalle & Roux, 2012
 Lesticus samarensis Dubault, Lassalle & Roux, 2011
 Lesticus samaricus Lassalle & Schnell, 2019
 Lesticus sauteri Kuntzen, 1911
 Lesticus serraticollis (Chaudoir, 1868)
 Lesticus sloanei Dubault, Lassalle & Roux, 2012
 Lesticus solidus Roux & Shi, 2011
 Lesticus stefanschoedli Kirschenhofer, 2005
 Lesticus strangulatus Lassalle, 2012
 Lesticus strictus Tschitscherine, 1897
 Lesticus suavis Tschitscherine, 1897
 Lesticus subcoeruleus Dubault, Lassalle & Roux, 2013
 Lesticus sulabayaensis Kirschenhofer, 2003
 Lesticus sulawesiensis Kirschenhofer, 1997
 Lesticus taiwanicus Roux & Shi, 2011
 Lesticus tenebrosicus Dubault, Lassalle & Roux, 2013
 Lesticus thetis Kirschenhofer, 1997
 Lesticus tonkinensis Jedlicka, 1962
 Lesticus torajaensis Kirschenhofer, 2007
 Lesticus toxopei Darlington, 1962
 Lesticus tricostatus Chaudoir, 1868
 Lesticus tristis Roux & Shi, 2011
 Lesticus uliweberi Lassalle & Schnell, 2019
 Lesticus vandoesburgi Straneo, 1948
 Lesticus vinarius Dubault, Lassalle & Roux, 2011
 Lesticus violaceous Zhu, Shi & Liang, 2018
 Lesticus viridicollis (W.S.Macleay, 1825)
 Lesticus waterhousei Chaudoir, 1862
 Lesticus wegneri Straneo, 1959
 Lesticus wittmeri Morvan, 1980
 Lesticus wrasei Dubault, Lassalle & Roux, 2013
 Lesticus xiaodongi Zhu, Shi & Liang, 2018

References

 
Pterostichinae